The R581 road is a regional road in Ireland which runs from the N20 at New Twopothouse village to Doneraile in County Cork. 

The road is 8km long.

In 2012 and 2013 the R581 was realigned to straighten it and to bypass some habitations.

See also
Roads in Ireland
National primary road
National secondary road

References
Roads Act 1993 (Classification of Regional Roads) Order 2006 – Department of Transport

Regional roads in the Republic of Ireland
Roads in County Cork